Luca Marini (born 10 August 1997) is an Italian Grand Prix motorcycle racer, competing for Mooney VR46 Racing Team in the 2023 MotoGP World Championship. He finished as runner-up in the 2020 Moto2 World Championship. He is the maternal half-brother of Valentino Rossi.

Career

Moto3 World Championship
Marini made his début in the Moto3 World Championship at the 2013 San Marino and Rimini Riviera motorcycle Grand Prix as a wildcard, failing to finish the race.

Moto2 World Championship
In , he got another wildcard entry at the same place, this time in the Moto2 class with Pons Racing Junior Team aboard a Kalex, finishing the race in 21st place.

Forward Team (2016–2017)

2016
In , Marini was signed by the Forward Team to compete full-time in the same class; he got his first Grand Prix points in Qatar, where he finished in 10th place, and his best result in Germany, where he had a 6th place finish. Marini still remained with the team for

2017
In , Marini was signed Forward Team. Finished in 4th place, Czech Republic.

Sky Racing Team VR46 (2018–2020)

2018

In , Marini achieved his first podium in Germany and his first victory in Malaysia.

2019
In , he secured two podiums in Mugello and Assen, leading to back-to-back wins at Thailand and Japan.

2020
In  Marini became a contender for the championship title along with Enea Bastianini and Sam Lowes, first round of the moto2 season saw Marini Retire at Qatar but would clinch his first place win at the second round at the Spanish Grand Prix and claim a second place finish in Jerez , with point scores at Brno in 4th place and another second place finish at the Austrian Grand Prix and a point finish in Styria before claiming his second win at Misano and a third win at the Catalan Grand Prix with the previous round being a 4th place finish.

Marini finished the French Grand Prix outside the points area in 18th and at Aragon saw the Italian high side off his bike and retiring from the race with Lowes taking the first place win and two more wins the next rounds with Marini finishing the same three rounds of the Teruel motorcycle Grand Prix, the European Grand Prix and Valencian Grand Prix in 11th, 6th and 5th place respectively and finishing 2nd in Portugal behind Remy Gardner who would claim first place

Marini finished the 2020 Moto2 season as the championship runner up with 196 points with over three wins and three 2nd place finishes which put Marini ahead of Lowes who had scored exactly the same points as Marini but Lowes claimed third and Marini second at the final race which meant that Marini was ahead of Lowes by rule, with Bastianini being nine points ahead of both Lowes and Marini respectively.

MotoGP World Championship

Sky VR46 Avintia (2021)
For 2021, Marini moved to the MotoGP class joining the Esponsorama Avintia team along with 2020 Moto2 Champion Enea Bastianini, Marini however would use the Sky VR46 livery on his bike while Bastianini would use Avintia Liveries

For the first two rounds of his rookie season at Qatar, Marini ended up finishing 16th and 18th respectively on the grid outside the points area while his teammate Bastianini finished 10th and 11th the first two rounds. Portimao saw improvement for Marini as he managed to make it into Q2 of Qualifying through free practice and started 8th on the grid, he finished the race in 12th place.

Mooney VR46 Racing Team (2022–)
For 2022, Marini was confirmed to be moving up to the premier class, partnering his 2020 teammate at Mooney VR46 Racing Team, Marco Bezzecchi.

For 2023, Marini was confirmed for the Mooney VR46 Racing Team.

Career statistics

FIM CEV Moto3 Junior World Championship

Races by year
(key) (Races in bold indicate pole position, races in italics indicate fastest lap)

FIM CEV Moto2 European Championship

Races by year
(key) (Races in bold indicate pole position, races in italics indicate fastest lap)

Grand Prix motorcycle racing

By season

By class

Races by year

(key) (Races in bold indicate pole position; races in italics indicate fastest lap)

References

External links

1997 births
Living people
Italian motorcycle racers
Moto2 World Championship riders
Moto3 World Championship riders
People from Urbino
MotoGP World Championship riders
Esponsorama Racing MotoGP riders
VR46 Racing Team MotoGP riders
Sportspeople from the Province of Pesaro and Urbino